Apata is a genus of sea slugs, specifically aeolid nudibranchs, marine gastropod molluscs in the family Apataidae.

Species 
Species within the genus Apata are as follows:
 Apata pricei (MacFarland, 1966)

References

Apataidae